The Treaty of Accession 2005 is an agreement between the member states of European Union and Bulgaria and Romania. It entered into force on 1 January 2007. The Treaty arranged accession of Bulgaria and Romania to the EU and amended earlier Treaties of the European Union. As such it is an integral part of the constitutional basis of the European Union.

Full title

The full official name of the Treaty is:

History
Following successful completion of accession negotiations European Council concluded on 17 December 2004 that Bulgaria and Romania were ready to become members of the European Union. A request for assent (C6‑0085/2005) was submitted to the European Parliament.

On 22 February, the 2005 European Commission delivered a favourable opinion on the accession to the European Union of Bulgaria and Romania. As a result, on 13 April 2005 the European Parliament gave assent to the applications of Bulgaria and Romania to become members of the European Union. The parliament voted in favour of Romania with 497 positive votes, 93 negative votes and 71 abstentions, while Bulgaria received 522 votes in favour, 70 votes against and 69 abstentions. On 25 April 2005 Council of the European Union accepted the applications for admission of Bulgaria and Romania.

The treaty was signed on 25 April 2005, in Neumünster Abbey, Luxembourg. In addition to the Treaty of Accession a Final Act was signed. The Final Act registers the results of the accession negotiations, including any declarations made by the parties. It also laid down arrangements for the period between signing and entry into force of the treaty. Ratification of the Treaty of Accession is summarized in the table below. The process was completed on 20 December 2006.

The default date for entry into force of the Treaty was 1 January 2007. Provisions were made for the postponement of the accession of one or both countries until 1 January 2008. Such a decision could have been taken by the Council of the European Union acting upon recommendation of the European Commission.  In its 16 May 2006 monitoring report, the Commission delivered the final recommendation about the date of accession, but requested further progress from Bulgaria and Romania.
The 26 September 2006 monitoring report concluded that both countries were sufficiently prepared to meet the political, economic and acquis criteria. It recommended against postponement of accession (instead of delaying membership it was decided to address the shortcomings through a subsequent cooperation and verification mechanism). The treaty entered into force on 1 January 2007.

Contents

1. Introduction

2. Treaty
The Treaty itself consists of six articles.

Article 1 arranges the accession of Republic of Bulgaria and Romania to the European Union.

Paragraph 1 makes Republic of Bulgaria and Romania full members of the European Union.

Paragraph 2 makes both countries parties to the Treaty establishing a Constitution for Europe and to the Treaty establishing the European Atomic Energy Community. Thus Bulgaria and Romania does not have to ratify the Treaty establishing a Constitution for Europe separately.

Paragraph 3 makes Protocol that sets the conditions and arrangements for admission and its annexes integral part of the Treaty itself.

Paragraph 4 annexes the above-mentioned Protocol to the Treaty establishing a Constitution for Europe and to the Treaty establishing the European Atomic Energy Community and makes its provisions integral part of these treaties.

Article 2 provides for the situation when the Treaty itself enters into force before the Treaty establishing a Constitution for Europe. Thus it will provide the legal basis of the membership Bulgaria and Romania from 1 January 2007 until the Constitution of Europe is finally implemented in its present form (if ever).

Paragraph 1 states that both countries become parties to the Treaties on which the European Union is founded. Provisions of Article 1, paragraphs 2-4 will be applicable only from the date of the entry into force of the Constitution of Europe.

Paragraph 2 states that until the above-mentioned event the conditions of admission and the adjustments to the Treaties on which the Union is founded will be provided by the Act annexed to the Treaty, which forms integral part of the Treaty itself.

Paragraph 3 arranges substitution of the Act with the Protocol upon the entry into force of the Constitution of Europe and legal consequences of this switch.

Article 3 defines all member states of European union, including Bulgaria and Romania as equal in respect of all Treaties of the Union, including this one.

Article 4 is about ratification and entry into force of the Treaty.

Paragraph 1 stipulates that the Treaty should be ratified by all parties by 31 December 2006 and ratification instruments should be deposited with the Italian government.

Paragraph 2 and 3 define the data from which the Treaty enters into force, mechanism for eventual postponement in respect of one or both of the acceding states, and provides for the situation when one or more country have ratified the Treaty, but have failed to deposit the ratification instruments by 1 January 2007. The ratification procedures were completed in time and the Treaty entered into force on 1 January 2007 on the territory of all member states.

Article 5 stipulates that the Treaty establishing a Constitution for Europe drawn up in the Bulgarian and Romanian languages shall be annexed to this Treaty and they will be authentic under the same conditions as the texts in all other official languages of the European union.

Article 6 states that the Treaty exists as a single original drawn in all official languages of the European Union. Each of these texts is equally authentic and the original will be deposited with the Italian government, while all parties will receive certified copies.

3. Protocol to the Treaty

4. Act to the Treaty

5. Final Act

See also
Law of the European Union
2007 enlargement of the European Union
Mechanism for Cooperation and Verification

References

External links
Full text of the Treaty and related documents

2005
Treaties of Romania
Treaties concluded in 2005
Treaties entered into force in 2007
Treaties of Bulgaria
2007 in the European Union
2005 in the European Union
2007 in Romania
2005 in Romania
2005 in Bulgaria
April 2005 events in Europe